Sami Farag Youssef (September 1, 1935 – February 21, 2015) was an Egyptian lawyer, judge, prosecutor and Vice-President of the Supreme Constitutional Court of Egypt. He was viewed by many as one of the most influential Copts in modern history.

Early life

He was born in Nazlet El Seman in the Giza province. He later studied law at Cairo University.

Career

He held the following offices:
Independent lawyer till February 1962.
Legal adviser to Banque Misr till September 1965.
Deputy General Prosecutor (1965-1973)
Judge and court president (1973-1981)
Prosecuting attorney in Faiyum (1981-1982)
Judge at the court of appeals (1982-1986)
Judge at the court of cassation (1986-1989)
Vice-President of the court of cassation (1989)
Vice-President of the Supreme Constitutional court of Egypt (1990-1999)

He is the person to have served the longest term (nine years) at the position of Vice-President of the Supreme Constitutional court of Egypt.

In 1995 he was appointed by President Mubarak to serve temporarily in the General Congregation Council of the Coptic Church. He was a very close and trusted friend of Pope Shenouda III. He would serve sometimes as the liaison between the government and the Church's leadership.

He represented Egypt 5 times at the Congress of the Conference of European Constitutional Courts.
In the 1996 Conference that was held in Budapest, his performance convinced the President of the Congress to name Egypt as an observant member at the Conference of European Constitutional Courts.

During his term at the Supreme Constitutional Court, he oversaw many cases involving the President of the Republic, the government and the Coptic Pope.

He trained and was the mentor of Egyptian President Adly Mansour.

Personal life

Sami Farag was the father of two sons and two daughters. He also left six grandchildren.

Death

On February 21, 2015, he died at the Anglo-American Hospital in Zamalek, Cairo.

President Abdel Fattah el-Sisi couldn't attend the funeral, so he sent General Mohamed Rostom to represent him instead.

Pope Tawadros II of Alexandria said after his death that Sami Farag was "a pious and great judge, a loyal servant to his church and his country."

References

1935 births
People from Giza
20th-century Egyptian judges
Coptic Orthodox Christians from Egypt
2015 deaths